The Revolutionary Left is a Trotskyist political party in France, primarily based around northern French towns such as Rouen. It is affiliated to the Committee for a Workers' International.

History
The origins of the Revolutionary Left lie in the Revolutionary Communist League (LCR), from which its members were expelled after winning the majority of that organisation's youth section, Jeunesse communiste révolutionnaire to its ideas. At expulsion in 1992, it had roughly 50-60 members.

After one member spotted a poster for the October 1992 Youth against Racism in Europe (YRE) demonstration in Brussels, members joined that demonstration where they met representatives of the Committee for a Workers' International. They eventually joined the CWI after discussions.

New Anticapitalist Party
In 2009 the Revolutionary Left participated in the foundation process of the New Anticapitalist Party (NPA) initiated by the LCR. The party became a current within the NPA while continuing independent work. In February 2012 the party left the NPA, which, due to its party structures and leadership, the Revolutionary Left no longer considers to represent a viable step towards a new mass workers' party.

References

External links
Revolutionary Left
Committee for a Workers' International

1992 establishments in France
Communist parties in France
Far-left politics in France
Political parties established in 1992
Political parties of the French Fifth Republic
France
Trotskyist organizations in France